"Always You" is a pop ballad and the second single by the Filipino singer Charice Pempengco, now known as Jake Zyrus, included on his second studio album, My Inspiration. Receiving ample radio airplay, it debuted on the MYX Music Chart at #20. It was written by Filipino songwriter Jonathan Manalo. The song was released only in the Philippines and South Korea. The song was nominated twice (including the prestigious Song of the Year) in the 23rd edition of Awit Awards in 2010. Awit is the Philippine version of Grammy Awards organized by the Philippine Association of the Record Industry. It received the Best Inspirational or Religious Recording but lost the Song of the Year award to Gloc-9's "Upuan".

Song information
The song is the first collaboration between Zyrus and Jonathan Manalo, a Metropop Song Festival and Awit Award-winning songwriter. The concept behind the composition of "Always You" is about being able to fight in a battle of life because of the strength given by someone's inspiration. The song was released on Mother's Day of May 2009 as a tribute to Zyrus's mother. A music video was released on the day of the release of the single at MYX.

Music video
The music video features Zyrus alongside his mother Raquel. Photos of him and his mother can be seen in some clips of the video.

Promotion
Zyrus first performed "Always You" at Wowowee on ABS-CBN Network during the release of My Inspiration. He also performed his single at ASAP '09 on July 5, 2009.

Awards and nominations

23rd Awit Awards

|-
| align="center"|2010|| align="center"|"Always You" ||align="center"| Song of the Year (for Jonathan Manalo, songwriter) || 
|-
| align="center"|2010 ||align="center"| "Always You" ||align="center"| Best Inspirational or Religious Recording (for Charice) ||

References

2009 singles
Jake Zyrus songs
2009 songs
English-language Filipino songs